Gary Griffin may refer to:
 Gary Griffin (director), American theater director
 Gary Griffin (musician), American musician
 Gary Griffin (sailor), Guamanian Olympic sailor